The 2012 Sheikh Jassim Cup was the 34th edition of the league cup competition for football teams from Qatar.

Al-Arabi are the defending champions.

Round One Groups 
18 clubs from the Qatar Stars League and Qatari 2nd Division were drawn into 4 groups. The winners of each group qualify for the semi-finals.

All group games are played in one 'host' location, instead of the common home and away format used in other competitions.

Group stage

Group A

Group B

Group C

Group D

Semi-finals

Final

2012
2012–13 in Qatari football
2012 domestic association football cups